Victor Bernard Green (born December 8, 1969) is a former American football safety in the National Football League. He was signed by the New York Jets as an undrafted free agent in 1993. He played college football at Akron.

Green also played for the New England Patriots and New Orleans Saints.

Professional career
Green entered the NFL as an undrafted free agent in 1993. By 1994, Green was the Jets' starting strong safety. He played for the Jets through the 2001 season. Green played the 2002 season with the New England Patriots and the 2003 season with the New Orleans Saints. On April 4, 2006, he signed with the Jets so that he could retire on the team with which he started his career. In 2003, Green was honored by being named a member of the Jets Four-Decade Team.

External links
Official website
Foundation website
Sports website

1969 births
Living people
African-American players of American football
People from Americus, Georgia
American football safeties
Akron Zips football players
Copiah-Lincoln Wolfpack football players
New York Jets players
New England Patriots players
New Orleans Saints players
Players of American football from Georgia (U.S. state)
21st-century African-American people
20th-century African-American sportspeople